Ambergate is a village in Derbyshire, England, situated where the River Amber joins the River Derwent, and where the A610 road from Ripley and Nottingham joins the A6 that runs along the Derwent valley between Derby to the south and Matlock to the north. Sawmills and Ridgeway are neighbouring hamlets, and Alderwasley, Heage, Nether Heage and Crich are other significant neighbouring settlements. The village forms part of the Heage and Ambergate ward of Ripley Town Council with a population of 5,013 at the 2011 Census. Ambergate is within the Derwent Valley Mills UNESCO World Heritage site, and has historical connections with George Stephenson; Ambergate is notable for its railway heritage and telephone exchange.  Ambergate has an active community life, particularly centred on the school, pubs, churches, sports clubs; and annual village carnival which is relatively large and consistent locally, with popular associated events in carnival week and throughout the year. The carnival is organised by a voluntary committee. Shining Cliff woods, Thacker's woods and Crich Chase border the village.

A mile east of Ambergate is Heage with its recently restored 18th-century windmill.

Until the early 19th century it was known as Toadmoor, with no more than a few artisans' cottages. The placename has previously been attributed as deriving from the Derbyshire dialect "t'owd moor" (Old Moor). The origins of Toadmoor have been traced back by the Survey of English Place-Names as meaning "toadpool", the earliest reference being in 1397 and associated references suggesting how the name of "toad mire" was later corrupted to become "toad moor" therefore confusing the landscape feature meanings of "mire" and "moor". As the area is a steep-sided valley bottom with notable floodplains, marsh and bog areas adjacent to the River Derwent the "toadpool" definition is more likely. The southerly half of the present village is still shown as Toadmoor on the Ordnance Survey's maps, and the name is retained in the street name Toadmoor Lane. The name "Amber Gate" was originally applied to the tollgate for the Nottingham turnpike, but was adopted by the North Midland Railway for Ambergate railway station on the Derwent Valley line.

The turnpike to Matlock was opened in 1818. Until then the main road from Belper northwards had been through Wirksworth and such traffic as there was, would have been mainly cotton from Arkwright's Mill at Cromford. However, the Cromford Canal, opened in 1794, also passes the village. In 1818 the turnpike to Nottingham was opened with a toll house at the junction.

The canal towpath can be followed from here to Cromford Wharf, passing High Peak Junction, which is the start of the High Peak Trail).  This  section is listed as a Biological Site of Special Scientific Interest (SSSI), and also forms part of the Derwent Valley Heritage Way.

In 1840 the North Midland Railway opened with a station at 'Amber Gate' which brought trade for 'omnibus and posting conveyance' to Matlock, which was becoming a fashionable spa town. By 1867 there was a through line from London St Pancras to Manchester, as well as to Leeds. Ambergate became an important interchange and, in 1876, Francis Hurt built the 'Hurt Arms' to replace the former 'Thatched House Tavern and Posting House' which the Midland Railway had converted into three cottages (now Midland Place). The main railway line runs through the elliptical Toadmoor Tunnel designed by George Stephenson.

In 1791 Benjamin Outram and Samuel Beresford had built kilns at nearby Bullbridge to process limestone from their quarry at Crich. George Stephenson had discovered deposits of coal at Clay Cross and realised that burning lime would provide a use for the slack which otherwise would go to waste. He leased Cliff Quarry at Crich, and built eight limekilns beside the railway. Within a year they had grown to twenty. They were connected by another wagonway known as "The Steep", a  self-acting incline at a slope of 1 in 5.

By 1851 the tiny hamlet had grown to a population of 206. In 1876 Richard Johnson and Nephew opened the wireworks by the river. In 1931 the population had reached 901, rising to 1,794 in 1951.

The quarry and the wagonway closed in 1957 but the limeworks carried on until 1965 and the passage of the Clean Air Act. The kilns were demolished the following year to build a storage facility and processing plant for natural gas.

In 1966 the first fully operational electronic telephone exchange in Europe opened in Ambergate.  This was also the first small to medium electronic exchange in the world and the first of many TXE2 type exchanges.

Public houses

Ambergate has two pubs: The Hurt Arms on the A6 and The Excavator on the A610 at Bucklands Hollow.

See also
Listed buildings in Ripley, Derbyshire

References

 Jewell, R., (1995) Images of Belper & Ambergate, Derby: Breedon Books
 The North Midland Railway Guide, (1842) Republished 1973, Leeds: Turntable Enterprises
 Cooper, B., (1983) Transformation of a Valley: The Derbyshire Derwent, Heinneman, republished 1991 Cromford: Scarthin Books

External links
 View photographic panoramas of Ambergate peakdistrictview.com

 "Picture the Past" Hurt Arms and the Tollbar circa 1880
 "Picture the Past" The A6 main road through Ambergate (Toadmoor) Toadmoor circa 1930. Very little has changed except that the road has since been paved.
 First production electronic exchange (1966) : Derbyshire's world-beater
 Exploring Ambergate Dye Works

Villages in Derbyshire
Towns and villages of the Peak District